This article displays the rosters for the participating teams at the 2014 FIBA Africa Club Championship for Women.

Club Sportif Police de Circulation

Club Sportif Sfaxien

Dolphins

First Bank

I.N.S.S.

Interclube

Kenya Ports Authority

Primeiro de Agosto

USIU Flames

See also
 2013 FIBA Africa Championship squads

References

External links
 2014 FIBA Africa Champions Cup Participating Teams

FIBA Africa Women's Clubs Champions Cup squads
Basketball teams in Africa
FIBA
FIBA